Kiera Van Ryk (born January 6, 1999) is a Canadian volleyball player. She is part of the Canadian women's national volleyball team. She participated at the 2018 FIVB Volleyball Women's World Championship, 2018 Women's Pan-American Volleyball Cup, and 2019 FIVB Volleyball Women's Challenger Cup.

University career
Van Ryk played two seasons of U Sports women's volleyball for the University of British Columbia Thunderbirds from 2017 to 2019. She finished her rookie season by winning a Bronze medal at the 2018 U Sports Women's Volleyball Championship. In her second year, she had an outstanding season as she won the Mary Lyons Award as the best U Sports women's volleyball player that year and won the Lieutenant Governor Athletic Award as the best female athlete in all of U Sports for the 2018–19 season. With the Thunderbirds that year, she won a national championship as the team won the 2019 U Sports Women's Volleyball Championship and Van Ryk was named the Tournament MVP.

Professional career
Van Ryk left university to become a professional athlete by signing with Volley Bergamo of the Italian Women's Volleyball League Serie A1 in 2019. She left Volley Bergamo and returned to Canada in 2020 due to the COVID-19 pandemic. She then joined KS DevelopRes Rzeszów of the Tauron Liga for the 2020–21 season. For the 2021–22 season, she played for Türk Hava Yolları SK of the Turkish Women's Volleyball League.

Personal life
Van Ryk attended Surrey Christian School and has two older sisters, Jocelyn and Amy. She is also an avid dog lover.

References

Exteneral links
 
 

1999 births
Living people
Canadian women's volleyball players
Outside hitters
University of British Columbia alumni
UBC Thunderbirds women's volleyball players
Canadian expatriate sportspeople in Italy
Canadian expatriate sportspeople in Poland
Canadian expatriate sportspeople in Turkey
Expatriate volleyball players in Italy
Expatriate volleyball players in Poland
Expatriate volleyball players in Turkey
Serie A1 (women's volleyball) players
Sportspeople from Surrey, British Columbia